Damara may refer to:

 Damara (people), Namibian people
 Damara (feudal landlord), landlords of ancient Kashmir
 Damara (Forgotten Realms), a fictional kingdom in the Forgotten Realms D&D campaign setting
 Damara, Central African Republic, a town
 Damara sheep, a breed of sheep
 Damara Megido, a character from the webcomic Homestuck

See also
 Damaraland, a region in Namibia inhabited by the Damara people